Ragay Gulf is a large gulf in the Bicol Peninsula of Luzon island in the Philippines, part of the Sibuyan Sea. It is separated from Tayabas Bay by the Bondoc Peninsula in the west. The gulf covers the provinces of Quezon and Camarines Sur.

Gulfs of the Philippines
Gulfs of the Pacific Ocean
Landforms of Camarines Sur
Landforms of Quezon